Řendějov is a municipality and village in Kutná Hora District in the Central Bohemian Region of the Czech Republic. It has about 200 inhabitants.

Administrative parts
Villages of Jiřice, Nový Samechov and Starý Samechov are administrative parts of Řendějov.

References

Villages in Kutná Hora District